Flávio is a Portuguese language given name, equivalent of Latin Flavius, and Italian and Spanish Flavio. The Portuguese diminutive form is Flavinho.

People
Flávio da Silva Amado (1979), better known as Flávio, Angolan footballer
Antônio Flávio, Antônio Flávio Aires dos Santos (1987) Brazilian footballer
Flávio Pinto de Souza or simply Flávio (1980) Brazilian football player
Flávio Conceição (1974), Brazilian footballer
Flávio Costa (1906-1999), Brazilian footballer and manager
Espiga, nickname of Flávio Aurélio dos Santos Soares, Brazilian professional basketball player
Flávio Guimarães (1963), Brazilian blues musician
Flávio Luis da Silva, Brazilian footballer and manager
Flávio Migliaccio, Brazilian actor
Flávio Canto (1975), Brazilian judoka
Flávio (footballer, born 1985), Flávio Henrique Esteves Guedes, Brazilian football goalkeeper
Flávio Saretta, Brazilian tennis player
Flávio José, Flávio José Marcelino Remígio Brazilian singer-songwriter
Flávio Ferri, Brazilian footballer in US
Flávio Chamis, Brazilian composer
Flávio Teixeira "Murtosa", Brazilian footballer
Flávio (footballer, born 2000)

References

Portuguese masculine given names